= Wandsworth Formation =

- Stratigraphic range: Neoproterozoic
- Type: Formation
- Unit of: Burin Group

Lithology
- Primary: Igneous (plutonic)

Location
- Region: Newfoundland
- Country: Canada
- Occurrence of the Wandsworth Formation in southeastern Newfoundland

The Wandsworth Formation is a formation cropping out in Newfoundland.
